The Canon TS-E 135 mm 4L MACRO is a tilt-shift, Macro prime lens that provides the equivalent of the corresponding view camera front movements on Canon EOS camera bodies. Unlike most other EF-mount lenses, it does not provide autofocus.

Overview
The TS-E 135 mm 4L MACRO provides four degrees of freedom, allowing ±10° tilt with respect to the film or sensor plane and ±12 mm shift with respect to the center of the image area; each movement can be rotated ±90° about the lens axis.

Shifting allows adjusting the position of the subject in the image area without moving the camera back; it is often used to avoid convergence of parallel lines, such as when photographing a tall building.

Tilting the lens relies on the Scheimpflug principle to rotate the plane of focus away from parallel to the image plane; this can be used either to have all parts of an inclined subject sharply rendered, or to restrict sharpness to a small part of a scene. Tilting the lens results in a wedge-shaped depth of field that may be a better fit to some scenes than the depth of field between two parallel planes that results without tilt.

Unlike most view cameras, the shift mechanism allows shifts along only one axis, and the tilt mechanism allows tilts about only one axis; however, the rotation of the mechanisms allows the orientations of the axes to be changed, providing, in effect, combined tilt and swing, and combined rise/fall and lateral shift.

The TS-E 135 mm 4L MACRO was the first lens from Canon which combined Macro and tilt-shift. It was announced together with a series of lenses, the TS-E 50 mm 2.8L MACRO and the TS-E 90 mm f/2.8L MACRO, which introduced the same features.

See also 
 TS-E 17 mm
 TS-E 24 mm
 TS-E 45 mm
 TS-E 50 mm
 TS-E 90 mm

References

External links 
 Canon stellt spiegellose 24-MP-Systemkamera EOS M100 und neue Profi-Objektive der L-Serie vor

Canon L-Series lenses
Canon EF lenses
Perspective-control lenses
Camera lenses introduced in 2017
Macro lenses